The Railway was a pub and hotel in Putney, in the London Borough of Wandsworth, it is now a Revolution chain bar.

Location 
The pub was on the northwest corner of the Upper Richmond road and Putney High street, at number 202 Upper Richmond road.

History 
The pub was built in 1886 on the site of the former Railway hotel.

The band The Police headlined their first gig at the pub in 1977.

The pub was managed by Drummonds between 1986 and 1993, then by J D Wetherspoon pub until 2017.  The pub was protected by Wandsworth Council from redevelopment in 2016.

Management 
In 2021 the pub is managed by the Revolution Bars Group.

References

External links 
 Putney Revolution bar website

Putney
Pubs in the London Borough of Wandsworth
Former pubs in London